The anime series Aim for the Ace! is based on the manga series of the same written by Sumika Yamamoto. The series was directed by Osamu Dezaki and produced by Tokyo Movie Shinsha. Aim for the Ace! aired from October 5, 1973, to March 29, 1974, on Mainichi Broadcasting System. The 26 episodes were later released several times into DVD; by Bandai Visual in 2001 and 2005, and by Avex in 2012. The episodes follow Hiromi Oka, a high school student who wants to become a professional tennis player as she struggles against mental weakness, anxiety and thwarted love.

A remake of the series, Shin Ace o Nerae!, produced by Tokyo Movie and was directed by Minoru Okazaki, was broadcast by Nippon Television between April 10, 1978 and March 31, 1979. Two original video animation (OVA) sequels, Ace o Nerae! 2 and Ace o Nerae! Final Stage, were also produced by the company. The first OVA was released by Bandai Visual between July 25, 1988, and October 25, 1998 on six VHS videocassettes, while the second one was released by from October 23, 1989, to April 24, 1990.

Hiroko Moriguchi sang Ace o Nerae! 2s theme, as well as "Never Say Goodbye", Final Stages theme.

Episode list

Aim for the Ace!

Shin Ace o Nerae!

Ace o Nerae! 2

Ace o Nerae! Final Stage

Notes and references
Notes

References

Aim for the Ace!